The  in Nikkō, Japan is one of the oldest western-style hotels in Japan.

History 
It opened in 1873.

See also
 Fujiya Hotel
 Nara Hotel
 Nagoya Hotel

External links
 Official web page

Hotels in Tochigi Prefecture
1873 establishments in Japan